Numa Droz (27 January 1844 – 15 December 1899) was a Swiss politician and member of the Swiss Federal Council (1875–1892). Born in La Chaux-de-Fonds, he was elected to cantonal government of Neuchâtel in 1871 and to the Swiss Council of States in 1872.

On 18 December 1875, he was elected to the Swiss Federal Council (becoming the youngest Federal Councillor ever at age 31) and handed over office on 31 December 1892. He was affiliated to the Free Democratic Party of Switzerland. He was elected President of Switzerland in 1881 and 1887. In 1887, he was considered as a potential civil governor of Crete but he declined. 

During his office time he held the following departments:
Department of Home Affairs (1876–1878)
Department of Trade and Agriculture (1879–1880)
Political Department as President of the Confederation (1881)
Department of Trade and Agriculture (1882–1886)
Political Department as President of the Confederation (1887)
Department of Foreign Affairs (1888–1892)

Droz has been described as a "man of progress" and "one of Switzerland's major political figures". 
He was appointed by Swiss Government for presiding the ALAI conferences following of which the Berne convention for the protection of literary and artistic works was concluded in 1886. "Numa Droz was an admirable choice for this role from the point of view of authors, as he had a strong interest in copyright matters, and had, in an article ... declared himself in favour of an international convention on literary and artistic property." He was to play a crucial role in the realization of the final convention. In 1898, he suggested a railway over the Bernina Pass which eventually was to be completed after his death. 

He was a radical democrat who clashed with Bismarck over a police spying case, the Wohlgemut Affair, in 1889. He died in Bern in 1899. 

In La Chaux-de-Fonds a street (rue Numa-Droz, the longest in the town) and in Neuchâtel a square (place Numa-Droz) are named after him. A statue by Charles l'Eplattenier which was erected by the station is at present being renovated and will be placed on Rue Numa-Droz in the autumn of 2012.

Works 
Numa Droz, Souvenirs d'un vieux montagnard. Histoire d'un proscrit de 1793. Nouvelle neuchâteloise, La Chaux-de-Fonds, Imprimerie du National suisse, 1869
Numa Droz, Instruction civique : manuel à l'usage des écoles primaires supérieures, des écoles secondaires, des écoles complémentaires et des jeunes citoyens, Lausanne, D. Lebet, 1884
Numa Droz, Études et portraits politiques, C. Eggimann (Genève), F. Alcan (Paris), 1895
Numa Droz, Le rachat des chemins de fer suisses, Bâle et Genève, Georg, 1898
Numa Droz, Essais économiques, Genève, C. Eggimann, 1906

References

Archive sources 
The Numa Droz collection is conserved in the State Archives of Neuchâtel. It contains documents about his privacy and documents of different fields of research.

External links

1844 births
1899 deaths
People from La Chaux-de-Fonds
Swiss Calvinist and Reformed Christians
Free Democratic Party of Switzerland politicians
Foreign ministers of Switzerland
Members of the Federal Council (Switzerland)
Members of the Council of States (Switzerland)
Presidents of the Council of States (Switzerland)